The Scimitar of the Prophet is a 1913 American short silent film drama directed by Robert G. Vignola. The film starred Earle Foxe, and Alice Hollister.

External links

American silent short films
1913 drama films
1913 films
American black-and-white films
Kalem Company films
1913 short films
Silent American drama films
Films directed by Robert G. Vignola
1910s American films
American drama short films